International Trauma Life Support (ITLS) is a nonprofit organization dedicated to the education in managing out-of-hospital trauma situations. ITLS was formed in 1982 as Basic Trauma Life Support. The organization's name was changed to highlight its focus on becoming an international standard. The educational materials presented by this organization are taught to emergency medical services' personnel across the United States and internationally.

The 8th edition of the organization's training manual was published in 2015, and an internationalized version of the 8th edition was published in 2018.

See also
 Prehospital Trauma Life Support
  Advanced Trauma Life Support

References

External links

Medical and health organizations based in Illinois
1982 establishments in the United States
Organizations established in 1982
Downers Grove, Illinois